Matsuri Con may stand for:
 Anime Matsuri, an anime convention held in Texas
 Matsuricon, an anime convention held in Ohio